Lorna is a feminine given name. The name is said to have been first coined by R. D. Blackmore for the heroine of his novel Lorna Doone, which appeared in 1869. Blackmore appears to have derived this name from the Scottish placename Lorn/Lorne. In the U.S., according to the 1990 census, the name ranks 572 of 4275, and as a surname, Lorna ranks 62296 out of 88799.

Notable people named Lorna
 Lorna Anderson, Scottish soprano
 Lorna Aponte, Panamanian rapper
 Lorna Arnold, British historian of the UK's nuclear weapons programmes
 Lorna Bennett, Jamaican reggae singer
 Dame Lorna May Boreland-Kelly, British magistrate and member of the Judicial Appointments Commission
 Lorna Dee Cervantes, Chicana American poet
 Lorna Cordeiro, singer from Goa, India
 Lorna Jane Clarkson, Australian fashion designer, entrepreneur and author.
 Lorna Crozier, Canadian poet and essayist
Lorna Dewaraja (born 1929), Sri Lankan historian
 Lorna Dixon, Australian Aboriginal custodian and preserver of the Wangkumara language
 Lorna Doom, American bassist for punk band The Germs
 Lorna Feijóo, Cuban ballet dancer
 Lorna Fitzgerald, British actress
 Lorna French, British playwright 
 Lorna Goodison, Jamaican poet
 Lorna Griffin, American shot putter and discus thrower
 Lorna Hill, British author, primarily of children's books
 Lorna Kesterson, American politician, first woman to serve as Mayor of Henderson, Nevada
 Lorna E. Lockwood, first female Chief Justice of a state supreme court in the US
 Lorna Luft, American singer and actress, daughter of Judy Garland and half-sister of Liza Minnelli
 Lorna Mahlock, American Brigadier general (one star) in the United States Marine Corps
 Lorna Maitland, American actress
 Lorna Maseko, South African chef and ballerina
 Lorna McNee, Scottish chef
Lorna Nyarinda, Kenyan footballer
 Lorna Patterson, American actress
 Lorna Raver, American actress who played Sylvia Ganush in the 2009 horror film Drag Me to Hell
 Lorna Sage, British literary critic and author
 Lorna Simpson, American photographer
 Lorna Slater, Canadian-born Scottish politician and co-leader of the Scottish Greens
 Lorna Tolentino, Filipino film actress
Lorna Vinden, Canadian wheelchair athlete
 Lorna Yabsley, British actress and photographer

Fictional characters
 Lorna Doone, protagonist of the 1869 a novel of the same name by Richard Doddridge Blackmore
 Lorna the Jungle Girl, comics character who debuted in 1953
 Lorna Dane, alter-ego of the female X-Men member Polaris
 Lorna, protagonist of the 1964 Russ Meyer film of the same name
 Lorna, principal character in the 2008 Belgian film Lorna's Silence
 Lorna Morello, women's prison inmate in Netflix television series Orange Is The New Black
 Lorna, a character from the animated miniseries Over the Garden Wall
 LORNA, protagonist of Lynn Hershman Leeson's 1983 Art game of the same name
 Lorna, younger sister to Maggie Beare in the ABC Television series Mother and Son (1984–1994)
 Lorna, comic book character by Alfonso Azpiri, and protagonist of the video game of the same name
 Lorna from the MMORPG Mabinogi (game) edutainment series "Lorna & Pan's Fantasy Life!"
 Lorna McNessie, the daughter of the Loch Ness Monster from Monster High

Other uses
"Lorna", Allied WWII reporting name for the Japanese Kyushu Q1W airplane
"Lorna Shore", American Deathcore Band from Warren County, New Jersey

References

English feminine given names
Scottish feminine given names
English given names invented by fiction writers
1869 introductions
1860s neologisms